Elizabethkingia endophytica is a slightly yellow Gram-stain-negative rod-shaped bacterial strain isolated from the stem of healthy 10-day-old sweet corn (Zea mays). A comparison of the 16S rRNA gene sequence of the isolate showed 99.1, 97.8, and 97.4% similarity to the 16S rRNA gene sequences of the type strains of Elizabethkingia anophelis, Elizabethkingia meningoseptica and Elizabethkingia miricola, respectively. DNA-DNA hybridization indicated that the strain is representative of a new species.

References 

Flavobacteria
Bacteria described in 2015